Liverpool-born Blacks are people of Black African ancestry born in the city of Liverpool. Liverpool has the United Kingdom's oldest and longest established black community, going back several generations. Liverpool's black community is also unusual among those in the United Kingdom, as the Liverpool-born Black British community often constitute a category distinct from later African and Afro-Caribbean migrants.

History
Dating to the 1730s, the Black community of Liverpool is Britain's oldest, with some Liverpudlians being able to trace their black heritage for as many as ten generations. The community dates back to the American Revolutionary War with Black Loyalists settling in the city. They were later followed by more African-American soldiers. The original African-American community was followed in the 19th and 20th centuries by sailors and soldiers from all over the West Indies and West Africa. The black community experienced continued growth due to the location of Liverpool as a port city. Liverpool's port attracted many servicemen and seafarers, including African Americans, Jamaicans, Trinidadians, Belizeans, Guyanese, Nigerians, Ghanaians, Gambians, and others from all over the Caribbean and Africa. Mostly settling in the Toxteth district, they joined already settled English, Irish, Welsh, Chinese and to a lesser extent Indians of seafarer or serviceman heritage. The Liverpudlian Black community became a Mixed-race community early on, with intermarriages taking place on a large scale among people with African roots, Whites and Asians. In turn most of today's Liverpudlian Blacks, even adding more recent Afro-Caribbean and African migrants, are product of a community that became a distinct multiracial community centuries ago. This process made the Liverpudlian Black community possibly the most distinct Black British community in the United Kingdom, creating a community that is native as well as unique to the country. In 2009 the black community was estimated to make up 1.9% of Liverpool's population. By 2011 the population of Liverpool was 2.8% black according to the 2011 census.

Social unrest
The Liverpool Black community experienced unrest early on, with race riots going back to the time of soldiers returning from the First World War. In 1919 white mobs descended on the predominantly black/mixed-race areas of Toxteth, leading to the drowning of a black former sailor Charles Wootton.

Infamous were the 1981 Toxteth riots, which was the direct result of long-standing tensions between the local police and the black community and that saw hundreds of police and public injured, one man dead, 500 arrested, 70 buildings destroyed and damage estimated at £11m.

Notable Black Liverpudlians
Hope Akpan, footballer
Trent Alexander-Arnold, footballer
David Aliu, basketball player
Diane Allahgreen, hurdler
Chris Amoo, singer for soul group The Real Thing
Joanne Anderson, Mayor of Liverpool (May 2021 - ) 
Victor Anichebe, footballer
John Archer, politician
Paul Barber, actor
Joe Bygraves, boxer
Craig Charles, actor and comedian
Steven Cole, actor
John Conteh, boxer
Louis Emerick, actor
Rebecca Ferguson, singer
Howard Gayle, first black footballer to play for Liverpool F.C.
Sugar Gibiliru, boxer
Chelcee Grimes, footballer
Billy Higgins, karateka
Michael Ihiekwe, footballer
Andy Iro, footballer
Jetta, musician and singer
Kim Johnson, MP for Liverpool Riverside
Katarina Johnson-Thompson, heptathlete
Natasha Jonas, boxer
Leon Lopez, actor
Cliff Marshall, first black Liverpudlian to play for Everton F.C.
Adam Nowell, basketball player
Anyika Onuora, sprinter
Nikita Parris, footballer
Larry Paul, boxer
Jordan Ramos, gymnast
Robin Reid, boxer
Cathy Tyson, actress
Laurence Westgaph, social and political historian

Further reading
Costello, Ray (2001). Black Liverpool: The Early History of Britain's Oldest Black Community 1730-1918. Liverpool: Picton Press.

References 

African diaspora in the United Kingdom
Liv
Black British culture in England
Black British history
People from Liverpool